841 North Lincoln Avenue in the Allegheny West neighborhood of Pittsburgh, Pennsylvania, was built in 1878.  It was added to the List of Pittsburgh History and Landmarks Foundation Historic Landmarks in 1977.

References

Houses in Pittsburgh
Houses completed in 1878
Pittsburgh History & Landmarks Foundation Historic Landmarks